Nusa Penida is an island located near the southeastern Indonesian island of Bali and a district of Klungkung Regency that includes the neighbouring small island of Nusa Lembongan and twelve even smaller islands. The Badung Strait separates the island and Bali. The interior of Nusa Penida is hilly with a maximum altitude of 524 metres. It is drier than the nearby island of Bali. It is one of the major tourist attractions among the three Nusa islands.

There are thirteen small islands nearby – Nusa Lembongan, Nusa Ceningan and eleven even smaller – which are included within the district (kecamatan). Administratively, the kecamatan of the same name, had a population of 45,110 at the 2010 census, covering 202.8 km2, very little changed from 10 years prior.

Bali Bird Sanctuary
Nusa Penida, and neighbouring Lembongan and Ceningan islands, are a bird sanctuary. The islands communities have used traditional Balinese village regulations to create the sanctuary. The idea of a sanctuary came from the Friends of the National Parks Foundation (FNPF).

In 2006 all 35 villages (now 41 villages) agreed to make bird protection part of their traditional regulations. Since then, the FNPF has rehabilitated and released various Indonesian birds, most notably the critically endangered Bali starling which is endemic to Bali but whose numbers in the wild had declined to less than 10 in 2005. After a two-year program by FNPF in which 64 cage-bred birds were rehabilitated and released onto Nusa Penida, their number had increased to over 100 in 2009. Other released birds include the Java sparrow, Mitchell's lorikeet and sulphur crested cockatoo.

Destinations
Points of interest on Nusa Penida include:

 Kelingking Beach
 Broken Beach
 Angel Billabong
 Crystal Bay
 Atuh Beach
 Diamond Beach
 Suwehan Beach
 Peguyangan Waterfall
 Tembeling Forest
 Segening Waterfall

Dive sites
Nusa Penida covers a wide area of diving locations, including Penida Bay, Batu Lumbung (Manta Point), Batu Meling, Batu Abah, Toya Pakeh and Malibu Point. The flow through the Lombok Strait is, overall, south-tending, although the strength and direction of the tidal streams are influenced by the monsoon seasons.

During the southeast monsoons, the tidal flow tends south; during the northeast monsoons, the tidal flow tends north. In the area of the strait north of Nusa Penida, the pattern is relatively simple, with a flow, at peaktide, of about three-and-one-half knots. Tidal streams in Badung Strait are semi-diurnal, but the character of the stream is very complicated because its direction runs obliquely to the general south to north direction of Lombok Strait, and the channel has a curved shape.

Based on survey in 2009, there was about 1,419 hectares coral sites with 66 percent covered the sites in 3 metres depth and 74 percent covered the sites in 10 metres depth.

References

External links

 
 
 Nusa Penida Tour Packages - Snorkeling 3 Island
 Packages Nusa Penida Tour & Snorkeling

Districts of Bali
Islands of Bali
Klungkung Regency
Populated places in Indonesia